In mathematics, the Remez inequality, discovered by the Soviet mathematician Evgeny Yakovlevich Remez , gives a bound on the sup norms of certain polynomials, the bound being attained by the Chebyshev polynomials.

The inequality
Let σ be an arbitrary fixed positive number. Define the class of polynomials πn(σ) to be those polynomials p of the nth degree for which

on some set of measure ≥ 2 contained in the closed interval [−1, 1+σ]. Then the Remez inequality states that

where Tn(x) is the Chebyshev polynomial of degree n, and the supremum norm is taken over the interval [−1, 1+σ].

The R.i., combined with an estimate on Chebyshev polynomials, implies the following corollary: If J ⊂ R is a finite interval, and E ⊂ J is an arbitrary measurable set, then

for any polynomial p of degree n.

Extensions: Nazarov–Turán lemma
Inequalities similar to  have been proved for different classes of functions, and are known as Remez-type inequalities. One important example is Nazarov's inequality for exponential sums :

Nazarov's inequality. Let
 
be an exponential sum (with arbitrary λk ∈C), and let J ⊂ R be a finite interval, E ⊂ J—an arbitrary measurable set. Then

where C > 0 is a numerical constant.

In the special case when λk are pure imaginary and integer, and the subset E is itself an interval, the inequality was proved by Pál Turán and is known as Turán's lemma.

for some A>0 independent of p, E, and n. When

a similar inequality holds for p > 2. For p=∞ there is an extension to multidimensional polynomials.

Proof: Applying Nazarov's lemma to  leads to

thus

Now fix a set  and choose  such that , that is

Note that this implies: 
 
 

Now

which completes the proof.

Pólya inequality

One of the corollaries of the R.i. is the Pólya inequality, which was proved by George Pólya  , and states that the Lebesgue measure of a sub-level set of a polynomial p of degree n is bounded in terms of the leading coefficient LC(p) as follows:

References

Theorems in analysis
Inequalities